Mike Derby (born ) is an American businessman and politician serving as a member of the South Dakota House of Representatives from the 34th district. Elected in 2020, he assumed office on January 12, 2021.

Early life and education 
Derby was raised in Rapid City, South Dakota and graduated from Stevens High School. He earned a Bachelor of Science degree in business administration from the University of South Dakota in 1979.

Career 
Derby is the owner of the Canyon Lake Resort in Rapid City. He was also the chair of the Rapid City Area Chamber of Commerce and a board member of Visit Rapid City. Derby served as a member of the South Dakota House of Representatives from 1997 to 2002. During his first tenure, he chaired the Military Affairs Committee and Ellsworth Task Force. He was also the vice chair of the South Dakota Legislative Executive Committee. Derby was re-elected to the South Dakota House of Representatives in 2020. He assumed office on January 12, 2021, succeeding Michael Diedrich.

References 

Living people
People from Rapid City, South Dakota
1950s births
Republican Party members of the South Dakota House of Representatives
University of South Dakota alumni
Businesspeople from South Dakota